Fotos Bomporis or Fotios Bomporis (died 28 February 1826), from Kranea was a Greek politician and chieftain of the Greek Revolution of 1821, deputy of the Souliotes in the First National Assembly at Epidaurus.

He was one of the most notable chieftains of Lakka Souliou in the early 19th century and leader of a rebel force under Markos Botsaris during the Revolution. He was present in Missolonghi on 4 November 1821 during the formation of the Senate of Western Continental Greece, as a "commissioner of Captains from Souli". He acted as deputy of the Souliotes in the First National Assembly at Epidaurus, by Markos Botsaris' suggestion, and he then became part of the Legislature. He was killed outside of Missolonghi, on 28 February 1826, while attacking a Turkish rampant. His dead body was taken from the Ottomans by men of his group, who transferred it to Missolonghi and buried it, the next day, in an individual grave with general honours. The mention on the cross on his grave that he Fell in the Exodus is not accurate, as he had already been killed before the Exodus of Missolonghi.

Further reading 
 Odysseas Betsos, "Fotos Bomporis. A fighter of '21 from Kranea. His action and his heroic death in Mesologgi", Epirotan Confederation - Interdisciplinary Cultural Yearbook of Preveza and the whole of Epirus, vol. 1, Kranea, Preveza 2005, p. 111-118, Epirotan Confederation Publications.
 Signatures of Fighters of the Greek Revolution, Album of the Historical and Ethnological Company of Greece, Athens 1998, signature Νο. 1550.

References 

Greek people of the Greek War of Independence
People from Preveza (regional unit)
1826 deaths
Year of birth missing